"Jingle Balls" is a song recorded by the American nu metal band Korn during sessions of their third studio album, Follow the Leader. It was released in Australia as an exclusive sampler, along with the track "Wake Up", in 1999.

Music and structure
"Jingle Balls" is a death metal rendition of the famous Christmas song "Jingle Bells", featured on a bonus EP included with Issues. It has been widely circulated as the "Jingle Bells death metal version" on the Internet. A slightly different and shorter version with bagpipes was played live on Los Angeles KROQ's Almost Acoustic Christmas concert in December 11, 1998.

Reception
In his review for All Mixed Up, Jason Birchmeier of AllMusic called the song "a one-time novelty, not one with lasting appeal".

Track listing
CD SAMP 2164
"Jingle Balls" – 3:27
"Wake Up" – 4:07

References

External links
 

Korn songs
1999 singles
1999 songs
Death metal songs
Epic Records singles
Immortal Records singles
Songs written by Reginald Arvizu
Songs written by Jonathan Davis
Songs written by James Shaffer
Songs written by David Silveria
Songs written by Brian Welch